Dawakin Tofa is a Local Government Area in Kano State, Nigeria. Its headquarters are in the town of Dawakin Tofa (or Dawaki).

It has an area of 479 km and a population of 247,875 at the 2006 census.

The postal code of the area is 701.

References

Local Government Areas in Kano State